Suwon Science College is a part of the University of Suwon with major specializations in nursing and air travel.

The college was established in 1977 as Suwon Technical School.

Notable academics 
Jeong Won Seop - President
In Suk Lee- Professor of Nursing

References 

Universities and colleges in South Korea
University of Suwon